SQLite is a database engine written in the C programming language. It is not a standalone app; rather, it is a library that software developers embed in their apps. As such, it belongs to the family of embedded databases. It is the most widely deployed database engine, as it is used by several of the top web browsers, operating systems, mobile phones, and other embedded systems. 

Many programming languages have bindings to the SQLite library. It generally follows PostgreSQL syntax, but does not enforce type checking by default. This means that one can, for example, insert a string into a column defined as an integer.

History
D. Richard Hipp designed SQLite in the spring of 2000 while working for General Dynamics on contract with the United States Navy. Hipp was designing software used for a damage-control system aboard guided-missile destroyers, which originally used HP-UX with an IBM Informix database back-end. SQLite began as a Tcl extension.

In August 2000, version 1.0 of SQLite was released, with storage based on gdbm (GNU Database Manager). In September 2001, SQLite 2.0 replaced gdbm with a custom B-tree implementation, adding transaction capability. In June 2004, SQLite 3.0 added internationalization, manifest typing, and other major improvements, partially funded by America Online. In 2011, Hipp announced his plans to add a NoSQL interface to SQLite, as well as announcing UnQL, a functional superset of SQL designed for document-oriented databases. In 2018, SQLite adopted a Code of Conduct based on the Rule of Saint Benedict which caused some controversy and was later renamed as a Code of Ethics.

SQLite is one of four formats recommended for long-term storage of datasets approved for use by the Library of Congress.

Design
SQLite was designed to allow the program to be operated without installing a database management system or requiring a database administrator. Unlike client–server database management systems, the SQLite engine has no standalone processes with which the application program communicates. Instead, a linker integrates the SQLite library  statically or dynamically  into an application program which uses SQLite's functionality through simple function calls, reducing latency in database operations; for simple queries with little concurrency, SQLite performance profits from avoiding the overhead of inter-process communication.

Due to the serverless design, SQLite applications require less configuration than client–server databases. SQLite is called zero-conf because it does not require service management (such as startup scripts) or access control based on GRANT and passwords. Access control is handled by means of file-system permissions given to the database file itself. Databases in client–server systems use file-system permissions that give access to the database files only to the daemon process, which handles its locks internally, allowing concurrent writes from several processes.

SQLite stores the whole database (definitions, tables, indices, and the data itself) as a single cross-platform file on a host machine, allowing several processes or threads to access the same database concurrently. It implements this simple design by locking the database file during writing. Write access may fail with an error code, or it can be retried until a configurable timeout expires. SQLite read operations can be multitasked, though due to the serverless design, writes can only be performed sequentially. This concurrent access restriction does not apply to temporary tables, and it is relaxed in version 3.7 as write-ahead logging (WAL) enables concurrent reads and writes. Since SQLite has to rely on file-system locks, it is not the preferred choice for write-intensive deployments.

SQLite uses PostgreSQL as a reference platform. "What would PostgreSQL do" is used to make sense of the SQL standard. One major deviation is that, with the exception of primary keys, SQLite does not enforce type checking; the type of a value is dynamic and not strictly constrained by the schema (although the schema will trigger a conversion when storing, if such a conversion is potentially reversible). SQLite strives to follow Postel's rule.

Features
SQLite implements most of the SQL-92 standard for SQL, but lacks some features. For example, it only partially provides triggers and cannot write to views (however, it provides INSTEAD OF triggers that provide this functionality). Its support of ALTER TABLE statements is limited.

SQLite uses an unusual type system for a SQL-compatible DBMS: instead of assigning a type to a column as in most SQL database systems, types are assigned to individual values; in language terms it is dynamically typed. Moreover, it is weakly typed in some of the same ways that Perl is: one can insert a string into an integer column (although SQLite will try to convert the string to an integer first, if the column's preferred type is integer). This adds flexibility to columns, especially when bound to a dynamically typed scripting language. However, the technique is not portable to other SQL products. A common criticism is that SQLite's type system lacks the data integrity mechanism provided by statically typed columns, although it can be emulated with constraints like CHECK(typeof(x)='integer'). Strict tables were added in version 3.37.1.

Tables normally include a hidden rowid index column, which gives faster access. If a database includes an Integer Primary Key column, SQLite will typically optimize it by treating it as an alias for rowid, causing the contents to be stored as a strictly typed 64-bit signed integer and changing its behavior to be somewhat like an auto-incrementing column. Future versions of SQLite may include a command to introspect whether a column has behavior like that of rowid to differentiate these columns from weakly typed, non-autoincrementing Integer Primary Keys.

Version 3.6.19 released on October 14, 2009 added support for foreign key constraints.

Full support for Unicode case-conversions can be enabled through an optional extension.

SQLite version 3.7.4 first saw the addition of the FTS4 (full-text search) module, which features enhancements over the older FTS3 module. FTS4 allows users to perform full-text searches on documents similar to how search engines search webpages. Version 3.8.2 added support for creating tables without rowid, which may provide space and performance improvements. Common table expressions support was added to SQLite in version 3.8.3. 3.8.11 added a newer search module called FTS5, the more radical (compared to FTS4) changes requiring a bump in version. 

In 2015, with the json1 extension and new subtype interfaces, SQLite version 3.9 introduced JSON content managing.

As of version 3.33.0, the maximum supported database size is 281 TB.

Development and distribution
SQLite's code is hosted with Fossil, a distributed version control system that uses SQLite as a local cache for its non-relational database format, and SQLite's SQL as an implementation language.

A standalone command-line shell program called sqlite3 is provided in SQLite's distribution. It can be used to create a database, define tables, insert and change rows, run queries and manage an SQLite database file. It also serves as an example for writing applications that use the SQLite library.

SQLite uses automated regression testing prior to each release. Over 2 million tests are run as part of a release's verification. Starting with the August 10, 2009 release of SQLite 3.6.17, SQLite releases have 100% branch test coverage, one of the components of code coverage. The tests and test harnesses are partially public-domain and partially proprietary.

Notable uses

Operating systems
SQLite is included by default in:
 Android
 BlackBerry 10 OS
 Fedora Linux where it is used by the rpm core package management system
 FreeBSD where starting with 10-RELEASE version in January 2014, it is used by the core package management system.
 illumos
 iOS
 Mac OS X 10.4 onwards (Apple adopted it as an option in macOS's Core Data API from the original implementation）
 Maemo
 MeeGo
 MorphOS since version 3.10
 NetBSD
 NixOS where it is used by the Nix core package management system
 Red Hat Enterprise Linux where it is used in the same way as Fedora, from which Red Hat Enterprise Linux is derived
 Solaris 10 where the Service Management Facility database is serialized for booting.
 Symbian OS
 Tizen
 webOS
 Windows 10 onwards

Middleware
 ADO.NET adapter, initially developed by Robert Simpson, is maintained jointly with the SQLite developers since April 2010.
 ODBC driver has been developed and is maintained separately by Christian Werner. Werner's ODBC driver is the recommended connection method for accessing SQLite from OpenOffice.org.
 COM (ActiveX) wrapper making SQLite accessible on Windows to scripted languages such as JScript and VBScript. This adds SQLite database capabilities to HTML Applications (HTA).

Web browsers
 The browsers Google Chrome, Opera, Safari and the Android Browser all allow for storing information in, and retrieving it from, a SQLite database within the browser, using the Web SQL Database technology, although this is rapidly becoming deprecated (namely superseded by IndexedDB). Internally, these Chromium based browsers use SQLite databases for storing configuration data like site visit history, cookies, download history etc.
 Mozilla Firefox and Mozilla Thunderbird store a variety of configuration data (bookmarks, cookies, contacts etc.) in internally managed SQLite databases. Until Firefox version 57 ("Firefox Quantum"), there was a third-party add-on that used the API supporting this functionality to provide a user interface for managing arbitrary SQLite databases.
 Several third-party add-ons can make use of JavaScript APIs to manage SQLite databases.

Web application frameworks
 Symfony 
 Laravel
 Bugzilla
 Django's default database management system
 Drupal
 Trac
 Ruby on Rails's default database management system
 web2py

Others
 Adobe Systems uses SQLite as its file format in Adobe Photoshop Lightroom, a standard database in Adobe AIR, and internally within Adobe Reader.
 As with much Apple software, Photos uses SQLite internally.
 Audacity uses SQLite as its file format, as of version 3.0.0.
 Evernote uses SQLite to store its local database repository in Windows.
 Skype
 The Service Management Facility, used for service management within the Solaris and OpenSolaris operating systems
 Flame (malware)
 BMW IDrive Sat Nav system
 TomTom GPS systems, for the NDS map data
 Proxmox VE - Proxmox Cluster File System (pmxcfs)

See also

 Comparison of relational database management systems
 List of relational database management systems
 MySQL
 SpatiaLite

References

Citations

Sources

External links

 
 
 

 
2000 software
C (programming language) libraries
Cross-platform free software
Embedded databases
Free computer libraries
Free database management systems
Public-domain software with source code
Relational database management software for Linux
Relational database management systems
Serverless database management systems
Symbian software
Public-domain software